Feral is a 2019 drama thriller film written and directed by Andrew Wonder. The film stars Annapurna Sriram. It is based on actual stories of living underground and working with former homeless individuals.

Feral had its world premiere at the Sarasota Film Festival on April 7, 2019 and its international premiere on October 17, 2019 at the Festival Du Nouveau Cinéma in Montreal. It was released to video-on-demand and digital platforms on June 2, 2020.

Synopsis 
Feral tells the story of Yasmine (Annapurna Sriram), a homeless woman living in the tunnels underneath Manhattan’s West Side. Surviving on her own terms while trying to build a new life alone, she is reeling from the loss of her mother, who was deported when she was 16. Older now, Yasmine, struggles to rise from poverty as the perils of the underground fill her with despair.

Along her journey, Yasmine meets a cast of characters and real New York personalities, each living in their own form of exile: a lonely piano player who’s never played his music out loud; a mother who regrets the birth of her six-year-old; a lonely grandmother nostalgic for her salsa music past and the Mission who is there to help, but only if she’s willing to play by their rules.

Cast 

 Annapurna Sriram as Yasmine

Production 
The film was inspired by director Andrew Wonder’s previous project tackling homelessness. Wonder first explored New York City’s subway system with the documentary Undercity, where he and Steve Duncan spent time overnight with homeless individuals in both NYC and Las Vegas.
Feral was shot within a month, utilizing a cast which included former homeless people and those who worked in the system.

Feral was produced by Wonder's company Tomorrow in association with Tony Award-nominated production company HIPZEE. Executive Producers included The Strange Ones'''s Michael Prall, and Above The Shadows's Tara Sickmeier and Robert Baunoch III.

 Release Feral had its world premiere at the Sarasota Film Festival on April 7, 2019. The film screened at the Bushwick Film Festival where Sriram’s performance earned a Best Actress Award. Feral had its international premiere in Montreal at the Festival Du Nouveau Cinéma on October 17, 2019. In 2020, 1091 Media acquired distribution rights to the film and it was released on video-on-demand and digital platforms on June 2, 2020.

 Reception 

The film was praised at the world premiere for the central performance of Annapurna Sriram. It was highlighted as a recommended film to watch for both the Bushwick Film Festival and the Festival Du Nouveau Cinéma.Feral also received praise from top critics, with Glenn Kenny of The New York Times praising FERAL's "bravura, multilayered lead performance by Annapurna Sriram", John DeFore from The Hollywood Reporter'' describing the film as "a gritty but artful portrait" and Dennis Harvey of Variety reviewing Wonder's film as "a promising debut worthy of discerning viewers’ attention."

References

External links 
 
 
 

2019 films
1091 Media films
2010s English-language films